Deutsch Schützen-Eisenberg is a municipality in Burgenland in the district of Oberwart in Austria.

It was the site of the 1945 Deutsch Schützen massacre.

Geography 
Parts of the municipality are Deutsch-Schützen, Edlitz im Burgenland, Eisenberg an der Pinka, Höll, and Sankt Kathrein im Burgenland.

Population

Politics 
The municipal council has 19 positions, of which the ÖVP has 14, the SPÖ 3, and the FPÖ 2.

References

Cities and towns in Oberwart District
Holocaust locations in Austria